This page shows the results of the Water Ski Competition at the 2003 Pan American Games, held from August 1 to August 17 in Santo Domingo, Dominican Republic. There were six events, three for both men and women, with Canada and the United States dominating the competition.

Men's competition

Slalom

Tricks

Jump

Women's competition

Slalom

Tricks

Jump

Medal table

References
 Sports 123

Pan
2003
Events at the 2003 Pan American Games